Boomeritis: A Novel That Will Set You Free is a polemical 2002 novel by American philosopher Ken Wilber, principally designed to explain Wilber's integral theory and to explain his concept of "Boomeritis". Wilber characterizes this as the deadly combination of a modern egalitarian worldview with a deep unquestioned narcissism commonly held by Baby Boomers and their children in the green meme of Spiral Dynamics, as opposed to Wilber's universal integralism.

Summary
The protagonist, "Ken Wilber", is a brilliant MIT student studying artificial intelligence. Ken believes that the future of evolution includes the departure of human consciousness from the physical realm, or "meatspace", and the transhuman merging of human intelligence with cyberspace.

Ken attends a series of lectures at an institution called the Integral Center (an obvious stand-in for the real life Integral Institute) which guides him towards a more expansive understanding of evolution and existence. These lectures are interposed with explicit descriptions of Ken's sexual fantasies with another character, Chloe.

The concept of Boomeritis
According to Wilber, "Boomeritis" describes a pathological belief system that afflicts Baby Boomers in particular. Boomeritis, in his view, is characterized by relativism, narcissism, and aversion to hierarchy. He believes that this attitude carried over to the so-called Generation X.

Wilber claims that he intended the novel to exhibit the traits of extreme post-modernism — irony, self-reference, noetic flatness — and thus to function as a literary reductio ad absurdum, assisting people, especially Baby Boomers, in overcoming the post-modern mentality.

See also

Generation X
Postmodernism

External links

Published reviews
"Boomeritis & Me: Not Just a Book Review" by Elizabeth Debold, What Is Enlightenment? Issue 22 (Fall-Winter 2002)
"Philosophy, yes, but as a novel, no" by James Lough, The Denver Post, September 22, 2002
"Boomeritis" by Don Lattin, The San Francisco Chronicle, June 16, 2002

2002 American novels

American satirical novels
Books by Ken Wilber
Integral theory (Ken Wilber)